Grant King is an Australian engineer and business executive. He retired as Managing Director of Origin Energy in October 2016, and in November 2016 became President of the Business Council of Australia.

Career
 prior to 1994 General Manager, AGL Gas Companies
 1994-2000 Managing Director, Boral Energy
 2000-2016 Managing Director, Origin Energy
 2004–2015 Chairman of Contact Energy
 2016–2019 President of Business Council of Australia (BCA)
 2020-present Chairman of HSBC Australia

King has also held roles as councillor of the Australian Petroleum Production and Exploration Association, director of Envestra and chairman of the Energy Supply Association of Australia.

References

Australian chief executives
Living people
Year of birth missing (living people)